The Wilhelmshaven–Oldenburg railway is a predominantly double-track, non-electrified main line in the northwest in the German state of Lower Saxony. It runs to the south from the port city of Wilhelmshaven to Oldenburg. The line is being upgraded in connection with the construction of JadeWeserPort so that it will be continuously duplicated and electrified.

Route

The Oldenburg–Wilhelmshaven line (VzG 1522) is currently duplicated with the exception of two sections, Varel–Jaderberg and Hahn–Rastede, and is designed for a top speed of 120 km/h.

History
The track was a joint project of the Grand Duchy of Oldenburg State Railways and the Prussian state railways and was built together with the Oldenburg–Bremen line. It linked the Prussian naval base in Wilhelmshaven (then called Heppens) and opened up the north of the Grand Duchy. It was officially opened on 18 July 1867, but scheduled services started on 3 September 1867.

The responsibility for the route was taken over in 1920 by the Reichsbahndirektion (Deutsche Reichsbahn railway division) of Oldenburg on 1 April 1920 when the Oldenburg State Railways were absorbed into Deutsche Reichsbahn.

The line experienced its heyday during the time of Deutsche Reichsbahn. In 1938–1939, as a result of Wilhelmshaven's status as a navy base, the line was served, along with other services, by a high-speed diesel multiple unit (Schnellverkehrs-Triebwagen, abbreviated SVT) service called the SVT Hamburg, which ran each day from Wilhelmshaven to Berlin Lehrter Bahnhof and back via Oldenburg, Bremen, Langwedel, Uelzen, Salzwedel and Stendal. In the 1950s to the 1970s, there was a long-distance express train to Basel SBB and/or Zürich (sometimes continuing to Chur), as well as Frankfurt. There were also special long-distance trains at the weekend for conscripts returning home.

Individual coaches also ran through to the Berlin Stadtbahn, Munich and Stuttgart. There were also, seasonal, so-called guest worker trains from Yugoslavia and Greece to Wilhelmshaven and vice versa. During the annual Hanover Fair a service called the Messe-Kapitän ran daily on the line to Hannover-Messe station; it originally only had first class accommodation, but second class was added later. In the 1970s, the long-distance passenger traffic gradually lost its importance. The long-distance trains terminated at Lindau, Munich, Stuttgart and Frankfurt. Before the introduction of Interregio services, City-D-Zug (connecting trains to the main long-distance express network) services operated. So four pairs of trains ran daily between Wilhelmshaven and Bremen to connect to the long-distance network in Bremen. An apparent prosperity followed with the introduction of Interregio services. Now, Berlin, Cottbus and Leipzig were connected directly to/from Wilhelmshaven, achieving modern levels of comfort. The subsequent elimination of Interregio services to Wilhelmshaven finally ended the status of the Wilhelmshaven–Oldenburg line as a long-distance line.

In November 2000, the operation of passenger services was taken over by NordWestBahn. The contract was extended by twelve years by agreement in early 2005. The track is still owned by Deutsche Bahn.

Until December 2002, one InterRegio service was operated by the long-distance arm of Deutsche Bahn network on the route towards Leipzig and Berlin. Today only Regionalbahn services run on the line. Passenger numbers have risen since 2000 by more than 50 percent. This is explained by a reliable regular-interval schedule, better connections and the use of comfortable multiple units.

Prospects 

The start of operations in JadeWeserPort from August 2012 will increase the volume of freight trains significantly, so it was decided to duplicate the two sections of single track amounting to 13 kilometres between Rastede and Hahn and between Jaderberg and Varel. In addition the line is being electrified as has been demanded for at least a decade.

In August 2006 the Chairman of the Deutsche Bahn AG, Hartmut Mehdorn, gave a commitment to the then Prime Minister of Lower Saxony, Christian Wulff to electrify and duplicate the entire route by 2010. This project (duplication, raising the top speed to 120 km/h and electrification) was also incorporated into the Federal Transport Infrastructure Plan (Bundesverkehrswegeplan) of 2003 and was classified as a "priority project". The chances of implementation increased significantly again in November 2008, when the upgrade was included in the "Workplace Program for Construction and Transport" (Arbeitsplatzprogramm Bauen und Verkehr) of the federal government. A rail bypass of Sande, as required by its residents, is to be built at the earliest in 2015.

Specifically, the planned works are as follows:
Continuous double-track lines (status as of September 2011: construction, renovation and upgrading started in August 2011)
Electrification (status as of September 2011: currently shelved, work may begin in 2013)
Upgrade of the Sande–Weißer Floh–Ölweiche section (status as of September 2011: some parts have been completed, but others have not yet begun).

It was intended that the upgrade of the line be completed in August 2012 when JadeWeserPort is due to open. The original target, however, cannot be achieved. Recent statements give final completion dates between 2014 and 2016. Between early August 2011 and the timetable change in December 2012, the line between Rastede and Wilhelmshaven was closed for the upgrading of the line, including duplication. Operations between Rastede and Wilhelmshaven during this period was carried out by replacement buses operated by VWG Oldenburg, a partner of NordWestBahn.

While the duplication meant that the top speed of 100 km/h could be implemented at the end of 2012, electrification of the line was initially postponed. Despite the long planning period and the fact that the track before the Second World War was already duplicated, significant problems in the ground conditions of the line had to be resolved, The maximum speed on the Rastede–Varel (Oldb) section of line was increased to 120 km/h at the timetable change December 2014.

The opening of JadeWeserPort in September 2012 was expected to increase the volume of freight trains significantly. The plan envisaged an increase from eight to between 44 and 60 trains. This forecast has not been achieved because of the poor utilisation of the port so far. The electrification of the line has been delayed and according to recent planning is expected to be completed in 2018. The cost of these works is not yet known.

Current operations 

Normally the line is operated every hour with two-part Alstom Coradia LINT (class 41) diesel multiple units; depending on traffic coupled sets are operated. The average speed is 73 km/h and it achieves on this line nearly the quality of service of a Regional-Express. The vehicles are owned by the state and are leased by the Landesnahverkehrsgesellschaft (the public transport company of Lower Saxony) to NordWestBahn. Until 2000, Deutsche Bahn operated class 624 diesel multiple units and its InterRegio services were hauled by class 218 diesel locomotives until 2002.

Fares 

The trains can be used under an agreement between Deutsche Bahn and NordWestBahn with tickets available nationwide. Between Rastede and Oldenburg Central Station fares are set by the Verkehrsverbund Bremen/Niedersachsen (Transport Association of Bremen/Lower Saxony). Tickets for local trains can be bought from a machine on the train.

Notes

External link

Railway lines in Lower Saxony